The 2016 Kelly Cup Playoffs of the ECHL started April 13, 2016, following the conclusion of the 2015–16 ECHL regular season. The championship was won on June 9 by the Allen Americans.

Playoff format
At the end of the regular season the top team in each division qualified for the 2016 Kelly Cup Playoffs and are seeded either 1, 2, or 3 based on highest point total earned in the season. Then the five non-division winning teams with the highest point totals in each conference qualified for the playoffs and are seeded 4 through 8. The Kelly Cup final pits the Eastern Conference champion against the Western Conference champion.  All four rounds are a best-of-seven format.

Playoff seeds
After the regular season, the standard 16 teams qualified for the playoffs. The Missouri Mavericks were the Western Conference regular season champions and the Brabham Cup winners with the best record in the ECHL. The Toledo Walleye earned the top seed in the Eastern Conference.

Eastern Conference 
Toledo Walleye – North Division champions, Eastern Conference regular season champions, 99 pts
South Carolina Stingrays – South Division champions, 98 pts
Manchester Monarchs – East Division champions, 87 pts
Florida Everblades – 95 pts
Wheeling Nailers – 83 pts
Adirondack Thunder – 82 pts
Kalamazoo Wings – 82 pts
Reading Royals – 82 pts

Western Conference
Missouri Mavericks – Central Division champions, Western Conference regular season champions, Brabham Cup winners, 109 pts
Fort Wayne Komets – Midwest Division champions, 89 pts
Colorado Eagles – West Division champions, 86 pts
Allen Americans – 89 pts
Idaho Steelheads – 86 pts
Utah Grizzlies – 84 pts
Cincinnati Cyclones – 81 pts
Quad City Mallards – 80 pts

Playoff Brackets

Conference Quarterfinals 
Home team is listed first.

Eastern Conference

(1) Toledo Walleye vs. (8) Reading Royals

(2) South Carolina Stingrays vs. (7) Kalamazoo Wings

(3) Manchester Monarchs vs. (6) Adirondack Thunder

(4) Florida Everblades vs. (5) Wheeling Nailers

Western Conference

(1) Missouri Mavericks vs. (8) Quad City Mallards

(2) Fort Wayne Komets vs. (7) Cincinnati Cyclones

(3) Colorado Eagles vs. (6) Utah Grizzlies

(4) Allen Americans vs. (5) Idaho Steelheads

Conference Semifinals 
Home team is listed first.

Eastern Conference

(2) South Carolina Stingrays vs. (6) Adirondack Thunder

(5) Wheeling Nailers vs. (8) Reading Royals

Western Conference

(1) Missouri Mavericks vs. (4) Allen Americans

(2) Fort Wayne Komets vs. (6) Utah Grizzlies

Conference Finals
Home team is listed first.

Eastern Conference

(2) South Carolina Stingrays vs. (5) Wheeling Nailers

Western Conference

(2) Fort Wayne Komets vs. (4) Allen Americans

Kelly Cup Finals 
Home team is listed first.

(West #4) Allen Americans vs. (East #5) Wheeling Nailers

Statistical leaders

Skaters
These are the top ten skaters based on points.

GP = Games played; G = Goals; A = Assists; Pts = Points; +/– = Plus/minus; PIM = Penalty minutes

Goaltending

This is a combined table of the top five goaltenders based on goals against average and the top five goaltenders based on save percentage, with at least 240 minutes played. The table is sorted by GAA, and the criteria for inclusion are bolded.

GP = Games played; W = Wins; L = Losses; OTL = Overtime losses; SA = Shots against; GA = Goals against; GAA = Goals against average; SV% = Save percentage; SO = Shutouts; TOI = Time on ice (in minutes)

See also 
 2015–16 ECHL season
 List of ECHL seasons

References

External links
ECHL website

Kelly Cup playoffs
2015–16 ECHL season